is a village located in Shiribeshi Subprefecture, Hokkaido, Japan.

As of September 2016, the village has an estimated population of 2,081. The total area is 114.43 km2.

History
1897: Makkari Village split off from Abuta Village (now Toyako Town).
1901: Kaributo Village (now Niseko Town) was split off from Makkari Village.
1906: Makkari Village became a Second Class Village.
1910: Makkari Village was transferred from Muroran Subprefecture (now Iburi Subprefecture) to Shiribeshi Subprefecture.
1917: Kimobetsu Village (now town) was split off from Makkari Village.
1922: Makkaribetsu Village (now Makkari Village) was split off from Makkari Village.
1925: Makkari Village changed its name to Rusutsu Village.
1941: Makkaribetsu Village changed its name to Makkari Village.

Geography
Makkari is located on the southern foot of Mount Yōtei. The name is derived from Ainu word "mak-kari-pet", meaning "River which flows around Mount Yōtei".

Neighboring municipalities
 Shiribeshi Subprefecture
 Kutchan
 Kyogoku
 Kimobetsu
 Niseko
 Rusutsu
 Iburi Subprefecture
 Toyoura
 Toyako

Climate

Education
 High school
 Hokkaido Makkari High School
 Junior high school
 Makkari Junior High School
 Elementary school
 Makkari Elementary School
 Ohonai Elementary School

Sister city
  Kanonji, Kagawa (since 1991)

Notable people from Makkari
Takashi Hosokawa, enka singer

References

External links

Makkari Official Website 

Villages in Hokkaido